This is a list of genera belonging to the family Apiaceae. It contains all the genera accepted by Plants of the World Online (PoWO) . A few extra genus names are included that PoWO regards as synonyms. Unless otherwise indicated, the placement of genera into sub-taxa is based on the taxonomy used by the Germplasm Resources Information Network (GRIN). "Not assigned" means either that the genus is unplaced in GRIN or that it is not listed by GRIN.

Not assigned to a subfamily  
In a 2021 molecular phylogenetic study, the Platysace clade and the genera Klotzschia and Hermas fell outside the four subfamilies. It has been suggested that they could be placed in subfamilies of their own.
Hermas L.
Klotzschia Cham.
Platysace Bunge

Others

Subfamily Apioideae

Not assigned to a tribe
Acronema Falc. ex Edgew.
Azilia Hedge & Lamond
Bilacunaria Pimenov & V.N.Tikhom
Bonannia Guss.
Cachrys L.
Cenolophium W.D.J.Koch
Conioselinum Hoffm.
Conium L.
Diplolophium Turcz.
Diplotaenia Boiss.
Ferulago W.D.J.Koch
Hansenia Turcz.
Harrysmithia H.Wolff
Heptaptera Margot & Reut.
Hymenolaena DC.
Keraymonia Farille
Krubera Hoffm.
Levisticum Hill
Ligusticum L.
Lithosciadium Turcz.
Lomatocarpa Pimenov
Magydaris W.D.J.Koch ex DC.
Meeboldia H.Wolff
Meum Mill.
Mutellina Wolf
Neogaya  Meisn.
Opopanax W.D.J.Koch
Pachypleurum Ledeb.
Paraligusticum V.N.Tikhom.
Paulita Soják
Petroedmondia Tamamsch.
Physospermopsis H.Wolff
Pleurospermopsis  C.Norman
Prangos  Lindl.
Pternopetalum  Franch.
Pterocyclus Klotzsch
Rohmooa Farille & Lachard
Seselopsis  Schischk.
Silaum  Mill.
Sinocarum  H.Wolff ex R.H.Shan & F.T.Pu
Sinolimprichtia  H.Wolff
Smyrniopsis  Boiss.
Sphaenolobium Pimenov
Stefanoffia  H.Wolff
Synclinostyles Farille & Lachard
Tilingia  Regel
Tongoloa  H.Wolff
Trochiscanthes  W.D.J.Koch
Vvedenskya Korovin, synonym of Conioselinum in GRIN

Tribe Aciphylleae
Aciphylla Forst
Anisotome Hook
Gingidia Dawson
Lignocarpa Dawson
Scandia Dawson

Tribe Annesorhizeae
Annesorhiza Cham. & Schltdl.
Astydamia DC.
Chamarea Eckl. & Zeyh.
Ezosciadium B.L.Burtt
Itasina Raf.
Molopospermum W.D.J.Koch

Tribe Apieae
Ammi L.
Anethum L.
Apium L.
Billburttia Magee & B.-E.van Wyk
Deverra DC.
Foeniculum Mill.
Naufraga  Constance & Cannon
Petroselinum Hill
Pseudoridolfia Reduron et al.
Ridolfia Moris
Sclerosciadium W.D.J.Koch ex DC.
Stoibrax Raf.
Visnaga Mill., synonym of Ammi in GRIN

Tribe Bupleureae
Bupleurum L.
Hohenackeria Fisch. & C.A.Mey.

Tribe Careae
Aegokeras Raf.
Aegopodium L.
Carum L.
Chamaesciadium C.A.Mey.
Falcaria Fabr.
Fuernrohria K.Koch
Gongylosciadium Rech.f.
Grammosciadium DC.
Hladnikia Rchb.
Rhabdosciadium Boiss.
Selinopsis Coss. & Durieu ex Batt. & Trab.

Tribe Chamaesieae
Chamaesium H.Wolff

Tribe Choritaenieae
Choritaenia Benth.

Tribe Coriandreae

Bifora Hoffm.
Coriandrum L.
Sclerotiaria Korovin

Tribe Echinophoreae
Anisosciadium DC.
Dicyclophora Boiss.
Echinophora L.
Mediasia Pimenov
Nirarathamnos Balf.f.
Pycnocycla Lindl.
Rughidia M.F.Watson & E.L.Barclay, nom. inval.

Tribe Erigenieae
Erigenia Nutt.

Tribe Heteromorpheae
Andriana B.-E.van Wyk
Anginon Raf.
Anisopoda Baker
Cannaboides B.-E.van Wyk
Dracosciadium Hilliard & B.L.Burtt
Heteromorpha Cham. & Schltdl.
Oreofraga M.F.Watson & E.L.Barclay, nom. inval.
Polemannia Eckl. & Zeyh.
Pseudocannaboides B.-E.van Wyk
Pseudocarum C. Norman
Tana B.-E.van Wyk

Tribe Komarovieae
Calyptrosciadium Rech.f. & Kuber
Changium H.Wolff
Chuanminshen M.L.Sheh & R.H.Shan
Cyclorhiza M.L.Sheh & R.H.Shan
Komaroviopsis Doweld, replacement name for Komarovia in PoWO
Parasilaus Leute
Sphaerosciadium Pimenov & Kljuykov

Tribe Lichtensteinieae
Lichtensteinia Cham. & Schltdl.

Tribe Marlothielleae
Marlothiella H.Wolff

Tribe Oenantheae
Berula W.D.J.Koch
Cicuta  L.
Cryptotaenia DC.
Cynosciadium DC.
Daucosma Engelm. & A.Gray
Harperella Rose
Helosciadium W. D. J. Koch
Lilaeopsis Greene
Limnosciadium  Mathias & Constance
Neogoezia Hemsl.
Oenanthe L.
Oxypolis Raf.
Perideridia Rchb.
Ptilimnium Raf.
Sium L.
Tiedemannia DC.
Trepocarpus Nutt. ex DC.
Trocdaris Raf.

Tribe Pimpinelleae
Aphanopleura Boiss.
Arafoe Pimenov & Lavrova
Demavendia Pimenov
Frommia H.Wolff
Haussknechtia Boiss.
Nothosmyrnium Miq.
Opsicarpium Mozaff.
Phellolophium Baker
Pimpinella L.
Psammogeton Edgew.
Spuriopimpinella (H.Boissieu) Kitag.
Zeravschania Korovin

Tribe Pleurospermeae
Aulacospermum Ledeb.
Eleutherospermum K.Koch
Eremodaucus Bunge
Hymenidium Lindl.
Kamelinia F.O.Khass. & I.I.Malzev
Korshinskia Lipsky
Physospermum Cusson
Pleurospermum Hoffm.
Pseudotrachydium Kljuykov & Pimenov
Trachydium Lindl.

Tribe Pyramidoptereae
Ammoides Adans.
Astomaea Rchb.
Bunium L.
Crithmum L.
Cyclospermum Lag.
Elaeosticta Fenzl
Froriepia K.Koch
Galagania Lipsky
Gongylotaxis Pimenov & Kljuykov
Hellenocarum H. Wolff
Hyalolaena Bunge
Lagoecia L.
Lipskya (Koso-Pol.) Nevski
Microsciadium Boiss.
Mogoltavia Korovin
Notiosciadium Speg.
Oedibasis Koso-Pol.
Oreoschimperella Rauschert
Ormopterum Schischk.
Postiella Kljuykov
Pyramidoptera Boiss.
Scaligeria DC.
Schulzia Spreng.
Schrenkia Fisch. & C.A.Mey.
Schtschurowskia Regel & Schmalh.
Sison L.
Tamamschjanella Pimenov & Kljuykov

Tribe Scandiceae
Artedia L.
Cephalopodum Korovin
Glaucosciadium B.L.Burtt & P.H.Davis

Tribe Scandiceae subtribe Daucinae
Ammodaucus Coss. & Durieu
Cuminum L.
Daucus L.
Laser Borkh. ex G.Gaertn. et al.
Laserpitium L.
Orlaya Hoffm.
Thapsia L.

Tribe Scandiceae subtribe Ferulinae
Autumnalia Pimenov
Fergania Pimenov
Ferula L.
Kafirnigania Kamelin & Kinzik.

Tribe Scandiceae subtribe Scandicinae
Anthriscus Pers.
Athamanta L.
Chaerophyllopsis H.Boissieu
Chaerophyllum L.
Conopodium W.D.J.Koch
Geocaryum Coss.
Kozlovia Lipsky
Krasnovia Popov ex Schischk. (may be included in Kozlovia)
Myrrhis Mill.
Neoconopodium (Koso-Pol.) Pimenov & Kljuykov (may be included in Kozlovia)
Osmorhiza Raf.
Scandix L.
Sphallerocarpus Besser ex DC.
Todaroa Parl.

Tribe Scandiceae subtribe Torilidinae

Astrodaucus Drude
Caucalis L.
Lisaea Boiss.
Szovitsia Fisch. & C.A.Mey.
Torilis Adans.
Turgenia Hoffm.
Turgeniopsis Boiss., synonym of Glochidotheca in GRIN
Yabea Koso-Pol.

Tribe Selineae
Aethusa L.
Aletes J.M.Coult. & Rose, synonym of Cymopterus in PoWO
Ammoselinum Torr. & A.Gray
Angelica L.
Apiastrum Nutt. ex Torr. & A.Gray
Arcuatopterus M.L.Sheh & R.H.Shan
Arracacia Bancr.
Carlesia Dunn
Chymsydia Albov
Cnidiocarpa Pimenov
Cnidium Cusson
Coaxana J.M.Coult. & Rose
Cortia DC.
Cortiella C. Norman
Cotopaxia Mathias & Constance
Coulterophytum B.L.Rob.
Cyathoselinum Benth.
Cymopterus Raf.
Dahliaphyllum Constance & Breedlove
Dichoropetalum Fenzl
Dimorphosciadium Pimenov
Donnellsmithia J.M.Coult. & Rose
Dystaenia Kitag.
Enantiophylla J.M.Coult. & Rose
Endressia J. Gay
Eurytaenia Torr. & A.Gray
Exoacantha Labill.
Ferulopsis Kitag.
Glehnia F.Schmidt ex Miq.
Harbouria J.M.Coult. & Rose
Johrenia DC.
Kadenia Lavrova & V.N.Tikhom.
Kailashia Pimenov & Kljuykov
Karatavia Pimenov & Lavrova
Kedarnatha P.K.Mukh. & Constance
Kitagawia Pimenov
Ledebouriella H.Wolff
Ligusticopsis Leute
Lomatium Raf.
Magadania Pimenov & Lavrova
Mathiasella Constance & C.L.Hitchc.
Musineon Raf.
Myrrhidendron J.M.Coult. & Rose
Neonelsonia J.M.Coult. & Rose
Neoparrya Mathias
Niphogeton Schltdl.
Oligocladus Chodat & Wilczek
Oreocome Edgew.
Oreonana Jeps.
Ostericum Hoffm.
Ottoa Kunth
Perissocoeleum Mathias & Constance
Peucedanum L.
Phlojodicarpus Turcz. ex Ledeb.
Pilopleura Schischk.
Podistera S.Watson
Polytaenia DC.
Prionosciadium S.Watson
Rhodosciadium S.Watson
Sajanella Soják
Saposhnikovia Schischk.
Selinum L.
Seseli L.
Shoshonea Evert & Constance
Spermolepis Raf.
Stenocoelium Ledeb.
Taenidia (Torr. & A.Gray) Drude
Tauschia Schltdl.
Thaspium Nutt.
Thecocarpus Boiss.
Trinia Hoffm.
Vicatia DC.
Xanthogalum Avé-Lall.
Yildirimlia Doğru-Koca
Zizia W.D.J.Koch

Tribe Smyrnieae
Lecokia DC.
Smyrnium L.

Tribe Tordylieae
Afroligusticum C.Norman
Afrosciadium P.J.D.Winter
Capnophyllum Gaertn.
Cymbocarpum DC. ex C.A.Mey.
Cynorhiza Eckl. & Zeyh.
Dasispermum Neck. ex Raf.
Ducrosia Boiss.
Lefebvrea A.Rich.
Nanobubon Magee
Notobubon B.-E.van Wyk
Scaraboides Magee & B.-E.van Wyk
Stenosemis  E.Mey. ex Sond.

Tribe Tordylieae subtribe Tordyliinae
Heracleum L.
Kandaharia Alava
Lalldhwojia Farille
Pastinaca L.
Semenovia Regel & Herder
Symphyoloma C. A.Mey.
Tetrataenium (DC.) Manden.
Tordyliopsis DC.
Tordylium L.
Trigonosciadium Boiss.
Vanasushava P.K.Mukh. & Constance
Zosima Hoffm.

Subfamily Azorelloideae

Subfamily Mackinlayoideae

Subfamily Saniculoideae  
The NCBI Taxonomy Browser lists the tribes Saniculeae and Steganotaenieae in a separate subfamily, Saniculoideae. A 2021 molecular phylogenetic study supported the monophyly of the subfamily.

Phlyctidocarpa Cannon & W.L.Theob. may be placed in an expanded subfamily Saniculoideae.

Tribe Saniculeae
Actinolema Fenzl
Alepidea F.Delaroche
Arctopus L.
Astrantia L.
Eryngium Tourn. ex L.
Petagnaea Caruel
Sanicula L.

Tribe Steganotaenieae
Polemanniopsis B.L.Burtt
Steganotaenia Hochst.

References 

.
Apiaceae
Apiaceae